Yozhef Yozhefovich (or Iosif Iosifovich) Betsa (6 November 1929 – 24 February 2011) was a Ukrainian and Soviet football player and coach. Betsa was an ethnic Magyar. In December 2006 he was denied the invitation to accept a medal from the President of the Union of the Russian football veterans, Alexander Bagratovich Mirzoyan with the explanation that he has to reside in the Russian Federation. He was born and died in Mukacheve.

Honours
 Soviet Cup winner: 1955.
 Olympic champion: 1956.

International career
Betsa made his debut for USSR on 23 October 1955 in a friendly against France.

See also
Other famous Soviet Magyar footballers:
 Fedir Medvid
 Vasyl Rats
 Yozhef Sabo

References

External links
 Profile 
 Yozhef Betsa's obituary 

1929 births
2011 deaths
People from Mukachevo
Ukrainian people of Hungarian descent
Soviet footballers
Soviet Union international footballers
Soviet football managers
Ukrainian footballers
Ukrainian football managers
PFC CSKA Moscow players
SKA Lviv players
FC Spartak Ivano-Frankivsk players
FC Hoverla Uzhhorod players
FC Spartak Ivano-Frankivsk managers
FC SKA Rostov-on-Don managers
SKA Lviv managers
FC Metalurh Zaporizhzhia managers
FC Ararat Yerevan managers
FC Kairat managers
SC Odesa managers
FC Torpedo Zaporizhzhia managers
Olympic footballers of the Soviet Union
Footballers at the 1956 Summer Olympics
Olympic gold medalists for the Soviet Union
Olympic medalists in football
Honoured Coaches of Russia
Medalists at the 1956 Summer Olympics
Soviet people of Hungarian descent
Association football midfielders
Sportspeople from Zakarpattia Oblast